The Heavenly Bodies was a professional wrestling tag team that wrestled in the Tennessee area. The team consisted of Al Greene (real name Al Denney) and Don Greene. They were 7 time NWA Southern Tag Team Champions and wrestled as a tag team from October 6, 1955 to June 28, 1973.

History

Tennessee area (1955-1973)
The Heavenly Bodies was a tag team composed of Al and Don Greene. One of their matches was on October 6, 1969 in Memphis, Tennessee against Southern Tag Team Champions Dennis Hall and Johnny Walker with their titles on the line. The veteran tag team picked up the win, capturing the NWA Southern Tag Team Championship for the first time. They started feuding with Dennis Hall and Johnny Walker who were unable to regain the titles. Dennis and his new partner, the legendary Jackie Fargo, however, were able to beat the new champions for the titles only two weeks later. The first reign of Heavenly Bodies was short-lived as it lasted only two weeks. They won the titles for the second time on November 3, by beating Fargo and Hall for the titles. A week later, on November 10, they lost the titles to Bearcat Brown and Les Thatcher before regaining the titles a week later, on November 17. Their third reign was better and longer than their previous two reigns which lasted almost a month as they lost the titles to Dennis Hall and Johnny Long on December 15. On December 23, they defeated Hall and Walker in another longer reign where they lost the titles back to Dennis Hall and Johnny Walker on January 19, 1970 in a match in which Don was injured and sidelined.

Al formed a tag team with Frank Martinez and held the Southern Tag Team Championships three times. Don returned from injury in late 1970 and reunited with Al as Heavenly Bodies. In December, they beat Jerry Jarrett and Tojo Yamamoto for the titles before losing them back to Jarrett and Yamamoto on January 9, 1971. They won the titles a sixth time in 1971 when they defeated longtime rivals Dennis Hall and Johnny Walker. On May 31, they lost the titles to another longtime rivals Jarrett and Yamamoto before taking the titles back from them a final time on June 21. A week later, on June 28, their final reign ended when they were beaten by Jerry Jarrett and Jackie Fargo for the titles. Al and Don stopped teaming together, disbanding Heavenly Bodies.

Georgia area
After the Greene Brothers disbanded, Don Greene teamed up with upcoming star Jerry Lawler as the Heavenly Bodies throughout the Georgia territory. The team was short-lived, as Lawler would begin to focus on his singles career.

References

External links
 AWA Southern Tag Team Titles at Solie's Title Histories

Independent promotions teams and stables